Wake Up, Sunshine is the eighth studio album by American rock band All Time Low. It was released on April 3, 2020, and is their second release with Fueled by Ramen following Last Young Renegade in 2017. The album's fourth and final single "Monsters" is the highest-charting song of their career.

Background and recording 
The album comes after 2017's Last Young Renegade. In January 2019, the band began creating the record in drummer Rian Dawson's home studio in Nashville, Tennessee with Zakk Cervini and Andrew Goldstein. A majority of the writing and recording process took place in August 2019 at a mansion located in Palm Desert, California, (usually referred to by the band as the "marble mansion") that the band rented and lived in for a few months along with most of the team that worked on Wake Up, Sunshine. To finish the album, All Time Low members Alex Gaskarth and Jack Barakat rented a cabin with Cervini and Goldstein in Big Bear Lake, California.

Composition
The album’s overall sound has been described as pop-punk by critics.

Reception 

The album received positive reviews from critics, with some noting it as a nostalgic culmination of the band’s previous works. In a positive review, Emily Carter of Kerrang! called it "dreamy", "nostalgic", and "sentimental".

Track listing

Personnel 
All Time Low
 Alex Gaskarth – lead vocals, guitars
 Jack Barakat – guitars, backing vocals
 Zack Merrick – bass, backing vocals
 Rian Dawson – drums, percussion

Additional musicians
 Blackbear – vocal on track 7
 The Band CAMINO – vocals on track 9
 Dan Swank - guitars, keyboards, programming, percussion

Technical
 Zakk Cervini - producer, engineering, mixing (tracks 3, 4, 6, 8-11, 13, 15)
 Andrew Goldstein - co-producer
 Phil Gornell - co-producer, engineering
 Dan Swank - co-producer, engineering
 Neal Avron - mixing (tracks 1, 2, 5, 7, 12, 14)
 Andrew Cook - artwork
 Ashley Osborn - photography
 Ted Jensen - mastering
 Nik Trekov - editing

Charts

References 

2020 albums
All Time Low albums
Fueled by Ramen albums